Dhruv Chand Jurel (born 21 January 2001) is an Indian cricketer who plays for Uttar Pradesh. He is a right-handed batter and wicket-keeper.

Career
Dhruv Jurel started his journey of being a cricketer during a summer camp in his school. He there sighted some children while playing cricket and it develops his interest in the game. And then he got selected in U-14 at the age of 14, and then also played U-16 and U-19 for Uttar Pradesh.  

Biography of Dhruv Jurel is quite interesting and the youngsters can learn a lot from his struggling journey to make cricket his passion. As his mother have to sell her jewellery for buying the cricket kit for him and much more to know. 

Jurel made his Twenty20 debut on 10 January 2021, for Uttar Pradesh in the 2020–21 Syed Mushtaq Ali Trophy. Prior to his T20 debut, he was named as the vice-captain of India's squad for the 2020 Under-19 Cricket World Cup. In February 2022, he was bought by the Rajasthan Royals in the auction for the 2022 Indian Premier League tournament. He made his first-class debut on 17 February 2022, for Uttar Pradesh in the 2021–22 Ranji Trophy.

References

External links
 

2001 births
Living people
Indian cricketers
Uttar Pradesh cricketers